Love in Self Defense is a 2006 Spanish romantic drama film written, directed, and scored by Rafa Russo in his directorial feature debut. It stars Ana Fernández and Gustavo Garzón.

Plot  
Set in Spain's eastern coast, the plot follows the twisted relationship established between an idle woman claiming to be a painter (Adriana) and an Argentinian former football player turned scammer (Rubén) upon their meeting in a bar.

Cast

Production 
The film was produced by Mediapro alongside NBCUniversal Global Networks, and it had the participation of Antena 3. It was shot in the provinces of Barcelona and Tarragona.

Release 
The film premiered in competition at the 9th Málaga Film Festival in March 2006. Distributed by UIP, it was theatrically released in Spain on 9 June 2006.

Reception 
Jonathan Holland of Variety assessed that the "absorbing, slow-burning" film stars out "like a scam movie", "quickly mutating into something far more distinctive and emotionally complex", shining through its "commitment to its offbeat premise and its emotional truth".

Casimiro Torreiro of El País considered that the film abounds in situations that are very difficult to capture on film, failing at "building up plausible psychologies for its characters".

See also 
 List of Spanish films of 2006

References 

2006 directorial debut films
2006 romantic drama films
Spanish romantic drama films
2000s Spanish films
2000s Spanish-language films
Films shot in the province of Barcelona
Films shot in the province of Tarragona
Films set in Spain